Kansas City Hustle is a solo album by pianist Jay McShann that was recorded in 1978 and first released by the Canadian Sackville label as an LP before being reissued on the compilation CD Solos & Duets.

Reception

AllMusic's Scott Yanow noted "As usual, McShann drenches the songs he interprets with the blues, while always swinging; his basslines are always a joy".

Track listing
All compositions by Jay McShann except where noted
 "Round Midnight" (Thelonious Monk, Cootie Williams, Bernie Hanighen) – 6:00
 "(Since I Lost My Baby) I Almost Lost My Mind" (Ivory Joe Hunter) – 4:27
 "Kansas City Hustle" – 5:29
 "Willow Weep for Me" (Ann Ronell) – 7:47
 "Blue Turbulence" – 4:34
 "Don't Get Around Much Anymore" (Duke Ellington, Bob Russell) – 4:46
 "Baby Won't You Please Come Home" (Charles Warfield, Clarence Williams) – 4:08
 "Rockin' Chair" (Hoagy Carmichael) – 4:29
 "My Sweet Mama" – 5:24

Personnel
Jay McShann – piano

References

Jay McShann albums
1978 albums
Sackville Records albums